Bruce Colin Francis (born 18 February 1948) is a former Australian cricketer who played three Test matches on the Australian tour of England in 1972.

Francis was a hard-hitting opening batsman, who played for New South Wales from 1968–69 to 1972–73, Essex in 1971 and 1973, and toured South Africa with the D.H. Robins XI in 1973-74 and 1974–75.

A political science graduate, Francis helped Kerry Packer organise World Series Cricket, became James Packer's private cricket coach, and later helped organise the "rebel" Australian tours to South Africa in 1985-86 and 1986–87.

Francis also provided a response to the World Anti-Doping Agency's ban on 34 past and present players of Australian Football League (AFL) club Essendon.

References

Sources
 Hartman, R. (2006) Ali: The Life of Ali Bacher, Penguin: Johannesburg. .

External links

1948 births
Living people
Australia Test cricketers
New South Wales cricketers
Essex cricketers
International Cavaliers cricketers
Australian cricketers
Cricketers from Sydney
D. H. Robins' XI cricketers